Ratanga Junction was an amusement park located in Century City, Cape Town in South Africa.

The park opened in December 1998 as part of the development of the Century City area, adjacent to Cape Town's biggest shopping centre, Canal Walk. Its biggest ride was the Cobra rollercoaster. Ratanga Junction had a tropical island theme as can be seen in its logo and the fact that the park hosted several wet rides.  Since early on Ratanga Junction struggled from financial difficulties, scaling back the number of restaurants throughout the early 2000s and rumours of its imminent closure going back as far as 2004. These rumours were exacerbated by the park closing for certain winters in order to prevent losing money from running at a loss during winter and the sale of the park seemed likely to many Cape Town residents since the surrounding developments in Century City were all running successfully. Part of Ratanga Junction was closed in 2014 to make way for the Century City Square development, with the Diamond Devil Run and Crocodile Gorge rides decommissioned. Diamond Devil Run was reopened as Tren Minero at the Fantasilandia park in Chile.

On August 29, 2017, it was officially confirmed by the Rabie Property Group that the amusement park would be closing. The park was officially closed down on May 1, 2018. The area will be redeveloped for residential apartments, offices, hotels, restaurants and convenience retail.

Much of the old Ratanga Junction is open to the public as part of the new Ratanga Park, this is composed of a Waterbody and Public Park with the aim of being added to the Century City Parkrun when construction on the property is complete.

References

Amusement parks in South Africa
Defunct amusement parks
Tourist attractions in Cape Town
Amusement parks opened in 1998
Amusement parks closed in 2018
1998 establishments in South Africa
2018 disestablishments in South Africa